Rhinocypha tincta is a species of damselfly in the family Chlorocyphidae,
commonly known as a Papuan jewel. 
It is a medium-sized damselfly with a short stout body, it is black with blue markings, and has long dark wings with pterostigma.
It has been recorded from South-east Asia, New Guinea and the Solomon Islands in the Pacific, where it inhabits streams.

Gallery

Notes 
Early records of Rhinocypha tincta in Australia have not been confirmed.

References 

Chlorocyphidae
Odonata of Oceania
Odonata of Asia
Insects of New Guinea
Insects of Indonesia
Insects of Southeast Asia
Taxa named by Jules Pierre Rambur
Insects described in 1842
Damselflies